In Between is a 1987 Australian mini-series about four adolescents from Turkish, Cambodian, Macedonian and Ango-Australian backgrounds.

Cast

 Fatima Ugyan - Fatima
 Vichea Ten - Saret
 Sheryl Munks - Angie
 Jim Petrovski - Alex

References

External links
In Between at IMDb

1980s Australian television miniseries
1987 Australian television series debuts
1987 Australian television series endings
1987 television films
1987 films
Special Broadcasting Service original programming